Sprite is a clear, lemon and lime-flavored soft drink created by the Coca-Cola Company. Sprite comes in multiple flavors, including cranberry, cherry, grape, orange, tropical, ginger, and vanilla. Ice, peach, Berryclear remix, and newer versions of the drinks are artificially sweetened. Sprite was created to compete primarily against PepsiCo's 7 Up.

History 
The Sprite brand name was created by T. C. "Bud" Evans, a Houston-based bottler who also distributed Coca-Cola products, circa 1955 for a line of drinks with flavors such as strawberry and orange; the rights to the name were acquired by the Coca-Cola Company in 1960.

The lemon-lime drink known today as Sprite was developed in West Germany in 1959 as Fanta Klare Zitrone ("Fanta Clear Lemon" in English) and was introduced in the United States under the Sprite name in 1961 as a competitor to 7 Up.

Marketing

Sprite advertisements often make use of the portmanteau word “lymon”, a combination of the words "lemon" and "lime". Additionally, the bottle of the beverage has several concave spots, an attempt to emulate the bubbles caused by the soda's carbonation.

By the 1980s, Sprite had developed a large following among teenagers. In response, Sprite began to cater to this demographic in their advertisements in 1987. "I Like the Sprite In You" was the brand's first long-running slogan, and many jingles were produced around it before its discontinuation in 1994.

In 1993, marketing agency Lowe and Partners created a new slogan, "Control your thirst" with commission from the Coca-Cola Company. The new, more vibrant logo stood out more on packaging and featured a blue-to-green gradient with silver "splashes" and subtle white "bubbles" in the background. The product name, "Sprite" had a logo with a blue backdrop shadow. The words; "Great Lymon Taste!" which had been present on the previous logo, were removed. This logo was used in the United States until 2006, and similar variants were used in other countries until this year as well.

The brand's slogan was changed to "Obey Your Thirst", and jingles containing it became urban-oriented, featuring a hip-hop theme. One of the first lyrics for the new slogan was, "never forget yourself 'cause first things first, grab a cold, cold can, and obey your thirst.” Under the new slogan, Sprite tapped into hip-hop culture by leveraging up and coming, as well as underground rap artists including; LL Cool J, A Tribe Called Quest, KRS-One, Missy Elliott, Grand Puba, Common, Fat Joe, Nas and others in television commercials. Sprite expanded its urban connections in the late 1990s by featuring both amateur and accomplished basketball players in their advertisements. Famous NBA players and hip-hop artists such as LeBron James, Trae Young, Vince Staples, and Lil Yachty appeared in Sprite adverts.

In 1998, one commercial poked fun at products that featured cartoon mascots in the style of a horror film. In it, the mascot for a fictitious orange juice drink called "Sun Fizz" comes to life, terrifying the children and mother, and starts to chase them.

In the 1990s, one of Sprite's longest-running ad campaigns was "Grant Hill Drinks Sprite" (overlapping its "Obey Your Thirst" campaign), in which the well-liked basketball player's abilities, and Sprite's importance in giving him his abilities, were humorously exaggerated.

In 2000, Sprite commissioned graffiti artist Temper to design limited edition art, which appeared on 100 million cans across Europe.

In 2004, Coke created Miles Thirst, a vinyl doll voiced by Reno Wilson, used in advertising to exploit the hip-hop market for soft drinks.

In 2006, a new Sprite logo, consisting of two yellow and green "halves" forming an "S" lemon/lime design, made its debut on Sprite bottles and cans. The slogan was changed from its long-running "Obey Your Thirst" to just "Obey" in the United States and was outright replaced with "Freedom From Thirst" in many countries. This was the decade's first major shift in advertising themes.

The "Sublymonal" campaign was also used as part of the alternate reality game the Lost Experience. This also resurrected the "lymon" word.

Sprite redesigned its label in 2009, removing the "S" logo.

In July 2022, the Coca-Cola Company announced that Sprite will discontinue its green bottles on August 1 and switch to clear plastic bottles. The green plastic contains green polyethylene terephthalate (PET), an additive that cannot be recycled into new bottles.

In 2022, Australia released lemon flavoured variants Sprite Lemon+ and Sprite Lemon+ Zero Sugar.

Formula Changes
In France in 2012, the drink was reformulated removing 30% of the sugar and replacing it with the artificial sweetener Stevia, leading to the drink containing fewer calories. This soon spread to Ireland, the UK and the Netherlands in 2013.

A further formula change happened in the UK in 2018. This formula change done to coincide with the sugary drinks tax in the country, reduces the sugar amount and replaces Stevia with Aspartame and Acesulfame K. This formula was later extended to other regions across the world to coincide with similar sugar tax rules.

In the Netherlands in March 2017, Coca-Cola announced that Sprite would be re-launched exclusively as a sugar free drink, with the standard variety being discontinued and Sprite Zero being renamed as simply Sprite. This change was expanded to Ireland in 2018.

In Australia, Sprite was relaunched with a new recipe containing 40% less sugar (compared with old Sprite) in August 2019. Unlike most of the reformulations which use Aspartame, this version doesn't, instead using Sucralose in addition to Acesulfame K.

In March 2023, Coca-Cola announced another further formula change for Sprite and Sprite Zero Sugar in the United Kingdom, produced to differentiate the two varieties.

Variations

See also
 Soft drink
 Coca-Cola

References

External links

Coca-Cola brands
Lemon-lime sodas
Products introduced in 1961